Wapuskanectes is an extinct genus of elasmosaurid known from the Alberta of Canada.

Description
Wapuskanectes is known from the holotype TMP 98.49.02, articulated partial postcranial skeleton, including an almost complete pectoral girdle. It was collected in the western side of the Syncrude Base Mine near Ft. McMurray, from the Wabiskaw Member of the Clearwater Formation, dating to the earliest Albian stage of the Early Cretaceous, about 112 million years ago. Wapuskanectes is the oldest North American elasmosaurid to date.

Etymology
Wapuskanectes was first named by Patrick S. Druckenmiller and Anthony P. Russell in 2006 and the type species is Wapuskanectes betsynichollsae. The generic name is derived from Wapuska, Cree language for "a body of water with whitecaps on it" and also it is the etymology of the Wabiskaw Member, in which the holotype was found, and nectes, Greek for "swimmer". The specific name honors the late Dr. Elizabeth "Betsy" Nicholls, curator of marine reptiles at the Royal Tyrrell Museum of Palaeontology, for enduring influence on research in Mesozoic marine vertebrates.

References

Early Cretaceous plesiosaurs of North America
Fossil taxa described in 2006
Elasmosaurids
Sauropterygian genera